Cheikh El Hasnaoui (1910–2002) was a Berber singer born in a small town near Tizi Ouzou in Algeria.

Career
He sang Algerian chaabi music, and was, along with Slimane Azem, responsible for laying the foundations of modern popular Kabyle music in the 1950s and 1960s.

Death
He died in 2002 at Saint Pierre de la Reunion, France.

References 

Cheik El Hasnaoui website

1910 births
2002 deaths
Kabyle people
20th-century Algerian  male singers
Algerian mondol players
People from Tizi Ouzou Province